Kanal A is the first Slovenian commercial television station. The channel, which operates within PRO PLUS d.o.o., has national coverage. In its primary target group of viewers (18–49 years), Kanal A is the second most watched TV channel in Slovenia.

Viewers are offered the news program The World (SVET), which is broadcast on working days. In the fall of 2011 SVET launched a new Saturday edition: World: Zoom (Svet: Povečava). Kanal A also screens Moto GP races, TopGear, a program for car enthusiasts called The steering wheel (Volan). From autumn 2013 a new reality show TOP 4 with Tjaša Kokalj is screened.
Kanal A also screens several popular international formats, top feature films and hit series.

History
Viewers have been able to watch Kanal A since 16 May 1991. It was a completely new element on the Slovenian television market and at the time, the first independent television station on the territory of former Yugoslavia. Development accelerated with the entrance of SBS (1997), which enabled development of fast television technologies and internet.

On 23 October 2000 Kanal A merged with PRO PLUS d.o.o. The programming scheme was changed and Kanal A now offers even wider and complementary selection of contents to POP TV.  On 1 October 2001, the first news magazine program called Extra was launched (forerunner of Extra Magazine) and also a modern and urban weather forecast Meteor with foreign Slovenian-speaking hosts. Kanal A sets the glamour trends with Oscars (March 2001) and from May 2001, six years in a row, also with the beauty contests; Slovenia Miss Universe and Miss Universe World. In May 2002, Kanal A offered exclusive coverage for Slovenian territory of the World Football Championship in Tokio and in June 2006 one-half (32) of the matches of the World Football Championship in Germany.

On 27 March 2002 Kanal A launched the first reality show in Slovenia – Popstars, and one year later the second version of that music Odyssey. The music groups Bepop and Unique were born on Kanal A. Younger audiences were also able to enjoy the music show Non-Stop Music from March 2004 to the end of August 2004 the show E+, which presents »All you Need for Life«. Kanal A also offered the shows Katarina (2007), TV Tuba (2008), Svingerji (2008), Zvezda pokra (2010), etc. In February 2007, The World was launched as the first news show on Kanal A.

Achievements
Viktors 2002 (2003) – Viktor for special achievements for Popstars project (first reality show in Slovenia)
Viktors 2005 (2006) – Viktor for best television show E+
Viktors 2006 (2007) – Viktor for special achievements for coverage of the World Football Championship in Germany
Viktors 2007 (2008) – Viktor for promising media personality for Lili Žagar, anchor of the program The World, Viktor for television personality was awarded to Marko Potrč, anchor of the program SVET
Viktors 2008 (2009) – Bojan Traven (Viktor for special achievements)

Program 
In its domestic production Kanal A offers its viewers news and entertaining contents. The program is rich with numerous foreign hits—films, series. The news program The World on Kanal A (SVET na Kanalu A) is broadcast on working days at 18.00 and at 19.45 and is followed by a short summary including the latest news. 
The creators of the program form their stories on the basis of live television. The editorial policy is on the side of the ordinary man with a focus on the so-called citizen journalism—the viewers can participate in the show and send their MMSs or videos.

Current programming

Nationally created shows (fragment)

Nationally created series

Internationally created series

Internationally created shows

Internationally created animated series

Past programming

Nationally created shows

Reality shows

Game shows

News / tabloid shows

Comedy shows

Magazines

Sport shows

Music shows

Call TV

Other shows

Ljubo doma! (show similar to Extreme Makeover: Home Edition)
2009
Katarina (talk show similar to The Oprah Winfrey Show)
2007
Problem (comedy show)
2003
Mozaik Slovenije (documentary show)
2001
Zmenkarije (dating show)
in the 1990s and early 2000s
Komedija zmešnjav (comedy show)
in the 1990s and early 2000s
Odklop (comedy stunts show)
in the 1990s
Adrenalin (comedy stunts show)
in the 1990s
Aktivno! (talk show)
in the 1990s
Lepota telesa (show about fashion)
in the 1990s
Stilski izziv (show similar to Extreme Makeover)
in the 1990s
Modna dežela (show about fashion)
in the 1990s
Ob 20:00 si na Kanalu A priglejte (talk show)
in the 1990s
Klik (talk show)
in the 1990s
Imamo jih radi (talk show about pets)
in the 1990s
Dance Session (dance show)
in the 1990s
Moj film (talk show)
in the 1990s
Dobro jutro (morning talk show)
in the 1990s
Zajček dolgoušček (morning kids cartoon and talk show)
in the 1990s
Kaličopko (morning kids cartoon and talk show)
in the 1990s
Na piki imamo (news magazine)
in the 1990s
Danijeve Zvezde (Astro show)
1992–2006

Series

General director
Pavel Vrabec can be placed among the pioneers of the Slovenian media area and is a leading expert on the industry. Before he started his career in the company PRO PLUS d.o.o., he was a successful manager on popular Slovenian radio stations. He joined PRO PLUS in 1996 as Director of Sales. In April 2005, he was appointed Deputy General Director and until December 2009 he performed his function with a professional approach and thorough, long-standing expertise on the domestic market and abroad.

DVB-T
Since 1 December 2010 Kanal A is available free-to-air in the digital (DVB-T) broadcasting technique. Transmission is since 14 October 2013 a part of the national digital multiplex called multiplex C. On 16 January 2017 Kanal A ceased DVB-T broadcasts.

See also

 Pro Plus d.o.o.
 POP TV
 POP BRIO

External links

Kanal A at LyngSat Address
 Schedule for Kanal A

References

Television channels and stations established in 1991
Television channels in Slovenia
Mass media in Ljubljana
1991 establishments in Slovenia